Sara Lynn Darrow (née Frizzell; born July 29, 1970) is the Chief United States district judge of the United States District Court for the Central District of Illinois. She was formerly an Assistant United States Attorney in the United States District Court for the Central District of Illinois, where she was chief of the violent crimes section.

Early life and education
Darrow  earned her Bachelor of Arts in 1992 from Marquette University and her Juris Doctor from Saint Louis University School of Law in 1997.

Legal career
After graduating from law school, Darrow worked in the law offices of Clarence Darrow in Rock Island, Illinois.  Between 1999 and 2003, she worked in the Henry County, Illinois State's Attorney's Office in Cambridge, Illinois. In 2003 Darrow became an Assistant United States Attorney for the Central District of Illinois where she prosecuted significant criminal cases involving firearms, drugs, gangs, fraud, money laundering, and corruption.

Federal judicial service
On the recommendation of Senator Dick Durbin, Darrow was nominated to the United States District Court for the Central District of Illinois by President Barack Obama on November 17, 2010 to fill a vacancy created by Judge Joe Billy McDade, who assumed senior status. The United States Senate confirmed Darrow by unanimous consent on August 2, 2011, and she received her commission the next day. She started her term as Chief Judge on March 12, 2019.

Family
Darrow's husband Clarence Michael Darrow serves as an Illinois Circuit Court judge. Her father-in-law Clarence A. Darrow also served as an Illinois state court judge and served in the Illinois General Assembly.

References

External links

1970 births
Living people
American prosecutors
Illinois lawyers
Judges of the United States District Court for the Central District of Illinois
Marquette University alumni
People from Henry County, Illinois
People from Pontiac, Michigan
Saint Louis University School of Law alumni
United States district court judges appointed by Barack Obama
21st-century American judges
Assistant United States Attorneys
21st-century American women judges